Peta Jan Murphy (born 1 November 1973) is an Australian politician who has been a member of the House of Representatives since the 2019 federal election. She is a member of the Australian Labor Party (ALP) and represents the Division of Dunkley in Victoria. She is a member of the House of Representatives Social and Legal Affairs Committee, the House of Representative Economics Committee and the House of Representatives Select Selection Committee.

Early career

Prior to entering parliament, Murphy worked variously as a solicitor, barrister, Senior Public Defender at Victoria Legal Aid, Team Leader at the Victorian Law Reform Commission and as Chief of Staff to Labor Shadow Minister Brendan O'Connor MP.

Politics

Murphy first stood for Dunkley at the 2016 election on the retirement of Bruce Billson, gaining a 4.1% swing but losing to Liberal candidate Chris Crewther.

Murphy ran again in the 2019 election and with the benefit of an electoral redistribution that turned Dunkley from a marginal Liberal seat into a marginal Labor seat, along with a further 1.7% swing, was successful, becoming the first ALP member for Dunkley since 1996 and the first woman to ever represent the seat.

Murphy is an advocate for breast screening and early diagnosis of cancer and in her maiden speech spoke of her commitment to healthcare and creating employment opportunities in Melbourne's outer suburbs.

Since her maiden speech, Murphy has worked with the Breast Cancer Network of Australia to promote better treatment and understanding of cancer. Along with Lucy Wicks, former Liberal Member for Robertson, Murphy established the Parliamentary Friends of Women's Health in 2021 to provide a bi-partisan platform.

Murphy was re-elected with an increased margin at the 2022 Australian federal election

Personal life

Murphy was first diagnosed with breast cancer in 2011 at the age of 37. She received a new breast cancer diagnosis a few days after being sworn in to parliament in July 2019.

Murphy has played softball in the National League and represented NSW, ACT, Victoria and the Mornington Peninsula at the junior and senior level for squash. She is a past winner of the Australian 35+y Masters Squash, the US 35+y Masters Squash and the gold medal winner at the World Masters Games for 35+ years squash. She is a previous President of Squash Victoria, Vice President of Squash Australia and member of the World Squash Federation Governance and Audit Committee. Murphy has also served on the board of local Community Legal Centres, Peninsula Health and the Peninsula Waves.

Murphy is the current Patron of the Frankston City Bowls Club and the Frankston Vietnam Veterans Association.

She lives in Frankston.

References

 

1973 births
Living people
Australian Labor Party members of the Parliament of Australia
Labor Left politicians
Members of the Australian House of Representatives
Members of the Australian House of Representatives for Dunkley
Women members of the Australian House of Representatives
Australian barristers
University of Melbourne alumni
University of Melbourne women
Australian National University alumni
21st-century Australian women politicians
21st-century Australian politicians